Roger Maro Enoka is professor and former chair of the Department of Integrative Physiology at the University of Colorado at Boulder.  He is also the director of the Neurophysiology of Movement Lab.

According to Web of Knowledge, Professor Enoka has 232 published items, which have been cited a total of 9,254 times (as of Nov 10, 2014). His most frequently cited paper (622 citations) is titled "Neurobiology of Muscle Fatigue". Professor Enoka has an h-index of 51 as of November 10, 2014.

Notable publications 
In 2012, Enoka co-authored a review on the motor unit with C.J. Heckman. This work represents a major contribution as the work was published in Comprehensive Physiology, which is the most authoritative collection of review content ever assembled in the physiological sciences.

To appear in publication in 2013, Enoka co-authored a chapter in the 5th edition of Principles of Neural Science along with Pearson KG. The chapter is titled "The motor unit and muscle action."

Invited lectures and awards 
In May 2010, Enoka was inducted into the University of Otago, School of Physical Education Wall of Fame.

In July 2011, Enoka gave the Muybridge Keynote Lecture at the International Society of Biomechanics Meeting, held in Brussels, Belgium.

On Nov 1, 2012, Enoka delivered a keynote lecture titled "Adaptations in physical performance from childhood to senescence" at the 4th International Congress on Physical Activity and Public Health in Sydney, Australia.

References

External links 
Recent Publications on PubMed
Roger Enoka on NeuroTree
CU Faculty Focus with Roger Enoka
Lecture titled 'Neural Adaptations with Chronic Activity Patterns in Able-Bodied Humans'
Paris Motor Neuron Meeting Lecture titled 'Discharge characteristics of motor units at recruitment during sustained contractions differ for young and old humans' co-authored with Mike Pascoe

1949 births
Living people
American neuroscientists
American biomechanists
University of Otago alumni
University of Washington alumni
University of Colorado faculty